is a Japanese horror manga series by Narumi Kakinouchi and Toshiki Hirano, as well as an anime adaptation by the same creators. The anime was originally presented in a 4-episode OVA (Original Video Animation) licensed by AnimEigo in 1988, and was later adapted into a 26-episode television series licensed by Tokyopop (later by Maiden Japan) and released in 1997.

Plot
Stranded in the space between the human world and the demon underworld, the series central characters are a Japanese vampire girl named Miyu and her Western Shinma companion Larva. Miyu is the daughter of both a human being and a Shinma (a name for a race of "god-demon"). She was born a vampire and as such, she was awakened as the guardian whose destiny is to hunt down all stray Shinma and send them back to "the Darkness"; charged with the responsibility of returning the evil demons away. Before turning 15 years old, she yearns to return to the darkness herself but not until she has banished all the Shinma from Earth. And since her awakening, she remains cut off by the facts of who and what she is.

Most locations in the series are evocative of traditional Japan.

Characters

Major characters
 
 Miyu (OVA)  (Japanese), Pamela Weidner-Houle (English, AnimEigo dub), Annemarie Zola (English, Manga Entertainment dub)
 Miyu (TV)  (Japanese), Kimberly J. Brown (English, ep 1–7), Dorothy Elias-Fahn (English, ep 8–26)
 A beautiful girl who appears to be around 13 (in the OVA) or 15 (in later volumes of the manga) years old but in fact is much older, being a vampire. In Japanese, "Miyu" means "beauty of the evening", "beautiful evening" or "evening beauty". She can teleport, levitate, open dimensional portals, and use fire attacks (which also come in handy when sending a Shinma to "The Darkness"). When in her vampire appearance, Miyu is always barefoot even in the snow as she doesn't get cold. In the OVA, she is the child of a human father and a vampire mother in post–World War II Japan. In the TV series, on the other hand, her mother is human and her father is a Shinma guardian in pre-World War II Empire of Japan. In both cases, Miyu becomes the Guardian (also referred to as the "Watcher") after losing her parents. In the OVA, Miyu is depicted as child-like, manipulative and playful, and very flamboyant in talking, especially when having a conversation with Himiko, while the TV series' Miyu is more reserved, straightforward and composed. Even though she is a vampire, Miyu is not harmed by sunlight, holy water or crucifixes, and her reflection can be seen (this may be an effect of the fact she is not truly undead and her shinma parent is not like western vampires either). This is because she is technically a Daywalker having one human parent and one vampire. She needs to drink blood to survive and she chooses her 'victims' carefully since she apparently cannot take blood from others unless they actually give it to her willingly. So, Miyu picks people whom she believes to be "lovely" (either in looks or personality) who have usually suffered a tragic loss, and offers them their greatest wish – to be with their lost loved ones, at least in their dreams – in exchange for their blood. These people live in an endless dream state (which she calls "being in happiness" in the OVA). Miyu is protective of Larva and has great concern for him; this also implies that she has romantic feelings for Larva. In the TV series, when posing as a human, she goes by the name . In the OVA, she is seen to wear different clothes in every episode she appears in. For example in the first OVA, she wears her typical short kimono and light purple obi that is familiarized by all fans where her right foot has a ribbon-like wrapping around it. In the second OVA, she wears a Japanese school uniform during her stay at school and wears a bright red yukata when speaking to Himiko and confronting Ranka. In the third OVA, she wears a winter kimono which seems to cover her body more than the other two garments. Finally in the fourth OVA, she wears a very heavy black kimono and also wears a mask. However in the TV series, she only wears two types of clothing: the typical Japanese school uniform (there were two versions seen in the anime) and the kimono known by all fans and that is shown on box covers.

 
 Larva (OVA) 
 Larva (TV) 
 A gorgeous Shinma from the western world. In the OVA, Larva comes to prevent Miyu's vampire blood from awakening and kill her, but he inadvertently triggers it and she drinks his blood when he drops his guard. As a result of this failure, Larva's face and voice are sealed behind a mask for all eternity. In the TV series, Larva faces Miyu after she has become the Guardian. After he has struck her down, she drinks his blood. In both cases, Larva starts out as an unwilling ally, but later pledges to be by Miyu's side because he can sense her sorrow, something he was able to glimpse at during both blood-bond scenes. Larva can use his nails to slash things and (in the TV series) he can also wield a scythe. He is very powerful, as he is seen to win against every shinma without getting mortally wounded. In addition to this, in the TV series and the manga, he is able to access Miyu's flame powers, but does so rarely (so he says) as it reminds him of his greatest defeat. Unlike in the OVA, in the TV series and Manga, Larva can speak and will occasionally remove his mask; there's a possibility that Larva is in love with Miyu. The name "Larva" is taken from Roman mythology, which like "Lemures" refers to a restless spirit of the dead. Many of the Western Shinma appearing in the second manga series also follow a naming convention drawn from various European demons and spirits. Larva's name and signature mask may also have been inspired from the white, ghostly Venetian Carnival mask "Larva", also called "Volto." In Volume 1 of the TV series, Larva was called Lava in the English dub and subtitles. The following volumes referred to him as Larva.

 
 Shinmas are god-demons that take advantage of human souls for their own gain. Escaping from a dark world after being sealed into the darkness thousands of years, they hide in the human world and Miyu seeks to return them to it. Shinmas tend to haunt weak-hearted people by luring them to illusions that are supposed to achieve the dreams or desires of those people only to leave them in ruin. It is the job of a guardian vampire (namely Miyu) to send them back to the original dimension which simply named as "The Darkness" (also known as the Dark World). They seem to feed on human emotions, although there are some examples of blood-sucking, such as Ga-Ryu or even devouring whole humans as with Koh-Waku. However, not all shinma are inherently evil. Some use their abilities simply to interfere in humans lives for their own purposes. Sometimes even helping other humans by targeting others. Their powers typically include shape-shifting and the ability of soaring and/or flying. One can spot them by the unnatural glow in their eyes. Their dimension mirror human dimension, as they have nationalities. Some Shinma may be Japanese, some Shinma may be Chinese, and some Shinma may come from the West of Japan and China.

OVA series characters
 
 

 She is a beautiful, cynical, stubborn and knowledgeable spiritualist who encounters Miyu during a job in Kyoto. Their paths cross throughout the series as Himiko searches for her, convinced at first that she is just a monster without any redeeming qualities, but later coming to know more about her and Larva. At the end of the fourth OVA, Himiko is shocked as she remembers meeting Miyu when she was a child. Equally shocking is the implication that Himiko herself may have vampiric characteristics from that same encounter with Miyu, which have yet to manifest; apparently, Himiko is the first human who exchanged blood with Miyu, right after she became the Guardian.

 
 
 Appearing in Episode 1, Unearthly Kyoto, he is a handsome Kyoto youth that Himiko befriends. His girlfriend, Ryouko, was murdered by a "vampire" in front of him; upon being unable to protect Ryouko, he heavily blames himself and tells Himiko that he wants to kill the "vampire", not knowing that it is a Shinma. He is ultimately so crushed under his grief that he later accepts Miyu's offer to exchange their bloods, and Himiko is a witness of this. During the end of the episode Miyahito is seen in a catatonic state, his mind in a sort of dream-world as he sits down on a swing quietly; Miyu, disguised as a schoolgirl, tells a group of girls to not worry for him, since he's "living in happiness".

 
 Appearing in Episode 1, Unearthly Kyoto, she is the only daughter of a very rich and traditional family who has been into a coma for 60 days. Her parents call Himiko, believing her to be possessed; Himiko confirms that Aiko is under possession but is unable to exorcise the demon, and she's later attacked by a Shinma but Miyu saves her. Later Himiko finds out that Aiko and her parents were in a fatal accident and, right before that, the parents donated their blood (implied to be hh type, also known as Bombay Blood) to save her life; she fell into heavy depression, blamed herself and called herself a vampire. The "parents" that called Himiko were either ghosts or Shinmas, so she tries again to exorcise Aiko and it's shown that she had made a deal with the Shinma that attacked Himiko, letting it roam in exchange for it recreating her former life, including her kind and loving parents. Before Miyu banishes the Shinma, she tries to bite Aiko like she did with Miyahito, but Himiko interferes and Aiko passes away when the Shinma is sent away.

 
 
 Appearing in Episode 2, A Banquet of Marionettes, she is a shinma who places the essences of her victims into life-size dolls and then hides the dolls in a school's warehouse so she can slowly drain them of life. She fell in love with a handsome student of said school, Kei Yuzuki, who Miyu was also interested in. Kei, a young man who's tired of his uneventful life, wishes to be with Ranka even after finding out that she used him. Since he gave himself to Ranka voluntarily and she came to fall in love with him as well, and Miyu is forced to banish them both after Ranka transforms Kei into a creature like herself at his own request. Ranka is portrayed as an ally of Miyu in the Manga, however. She is one of the shinma of the second tier, and is quite powerful, as seen in the fifth volume where she tears the quarls apart with her light strings that she uses to control her dolls.

 
 
 Appearing in Episode 3, Fragile Armor, he is an old friend of Larva who sought to release him from Miyu. He uses magic as well as a human-turned-into-Shinma whose soul is trapped inside of a gigantic samurai armor, managing to seal Larva inside of a wall. Miyu believed that Lemures wanted to target her to become leader of the Shinma, so with Himiko's help she faced him. However Larva broke Lemures's spell when Miyu was captured and injured by Lemures's puppet Shinma, then he stayed true to Miyu. Instead of banishing Lemures to "The Darkness", a very angry Miyu killed him with fire as a punishment for abducting and harming Larva.

TV series characters
 
 
 Chisato is the main antagonist of the series. She is Miyu's best friend at school and a student at Tokiwa School For Girls. Early on in the second episode, she buys two key chain charms as tokens of friendship for Miyu and herself. She is unaware that Miyu is a vampire or any of Miyu's supernatural activities. In the final two episodes of the series, it is revealed that Chisato is in fact a stray Shinma.

 
 
 A Shinma who looks like a cute pink bunny and is an ally of Miyu. Her name means "undead", being a shinto character, the guardian of the dead. She shares a trait with all animal Shinma of having one regular eye and one yellow one. Her right ear covers her bulging, bloodshot yellow eye which enables her to see great distances and dispel illusions.

 
 
 A child-like Yuki-onna, her name means "cold feather". She carries on her forehead the first kanji of her name, meaning "cold". Her powers including floating, teleportation, and manipulating wind and snow. Her widowed father- was the head of a group of shinma protectors whose task was to ensure that a guardian (in this case, Miyu) would emerge during the Taishō period. When Reiha's father was struck down by the Bird Shinma, Black Kite, he called out Miyu's name instead of Reiha's before he died. Reiha has never forgiven Miyu for this. After the death of her father, she discovered her ice powers upon encountering a feasting shinma. From that day, she's been Miyu's rival who seeks to destroy shinma, believing Miyu is not fit to do the job. She is less sympathetic than Miyu, and is known to kill innocents who get in her way of destroying shinma. At some point, Reiha ended up freezing the city which led to a final confrontation with Miyu. After Matsukaze's sacrifice, Reiha unleashed a blizzard that was overwhelming Miyu before Larva broke free and beheaded Reiha. Her body picked up her head and left to go look for herself while vowing to return to defeat Miyu someday.

 
 
 Reiha's talking doll companion. His name means "wind of the pines", which in Japan represents an unshakable force, fidelity, conjugal love. He doesn't hide his contempt for Miyu. He is in a sense Reiha's surrogate father into which she has projected all her hostility and anger towards Miyu. In the final confrontation, Matsukaze used his ice abilities to trap Larva in an ice barrier so Reiha could fight Miyu. He later sacrificed himself to protect Reiha from Miyu's flame attack.

 
 
 Miyu and Chisato's slightly tomboyish classmate. She is very straightforward, and is protective of Hisae and Chisato. She is killed by Chisato near the end of the series shortly after she and Hisae discover Miyu's true nature.

 
 
 Miyu and Chisato's bookworm classmate. Shy and intelligent, she senses from the beginning that there is something odd about Miyu and takes steps to investigate. Unfortunately, her discoveries lead to her death as she and Yukari come in contact with Miyu shortly after dealing with a shinma. Hisae is killed by Chisato.

Manga characters
 
 Introduced as a main plotline character in Manga volume 4, she was a human who fell in love with a shinma, whom Miyu not long after returned to the darkness. She later teamed up with other shinma, friends of her "love" and tried many times to kill Miyu in revenge (only in manga). She returns in the last few chapters of the first manga series. It is revealed that Yuma spent the rest of her life pursuing Miyu and finds a way to destroy her. During her travels, she comes across several other characters Miyu drank from in earlier chapters.

 
 Yui is the daughter of human and a Shi (another type of demon that is also described as Anti-Shinma in some English translations). She is also part vampire as Miyu's blood runs in her veins as Miyu fed on her mother while pregnant with Yui. Like Miyu in her vampire form, Yui wears a short kimono and is always barefoot. Miyu describes Yui as both her sister, her daughter, and herself. Yui has long dark hair and looks to be about twelve or thirteen years old. Outside of her being the star of her own spin-off manga, Yui was drawn to Miyu's realm as part of a plan to resurrect Miyu. Yui's personality is much more shy and timid than Miyu's and she is still largely naive about the world at large. Yui's weapon of choice are cherry blossoms which she can bend to her will in a variety of ways. She passes this power to Miyu upon giving up her own blood for Miyu's resurrection.

 
 Nagi is a Shinma is a protector of Yui and also cares deeply for her. Like every other Japanese Shinma, he is quite powerful where he can fight as an equal against the Quarl. Nagi is very hot headed, but is a faithful companion allowing Yui to feed on him as she refuses to feed on humans.

Cast

Media

Manga

Original series
Spread out over ten volumes, this series storywise falls somewhere between the OAV and the television series. In this version, Ranka is the helpful second tier shinma, but Reiha is largely the same. Most volumes include several stand alone stories regarding Miyu hunting and locating stray Shinma. However, there are several chapters in various volumes relating to the western shinma. In this version it is Lemures who was Larva's companion previous to him coming to Japan. There is also Carlua, who is the daughter of Larva's adoptive uncle, Pazusu. Carlua is deeply in love with Larva (as is Lemures) but both fail in their attempts to "rescue" him from Miyu. These result in Lemures being banished to the darkness and Carlua being repelled, and her little sister Lilith being incinerated by Miyu. Additionally, there is a human girl named Yuma Koizumi who is introduced in volume 4 who becomes a return antagonist. As a school girl, Yuma was loved and marked by a shinma named Tsubaki. Tsubaki belongs to a clan of shinma called "Muma". When he starts to be hunted, Tsubaki is surprisingly accepting, although sad; at the fact he will be parted from Yuma. However, when Miyu returns him to the dark, Yuma vows vengeance. With the help of Tsubaki's companions, Yuma attempts to kill Miyu, knowing Miyu would have difficulty attacking a human foe. The attack ultimately does not succeed and Yuma is left to her misery as Miyu refuses to feed from her (partially out of spite, and out of respect to Tsubaki). In volume 10, it is discovered the Yuma spent the rest of her life pursuing Miyu and her mystery, but is never able to kill her. In the end, Miyu visits Yuma on her death bed, finally drinking her blood.

The manga was licensed for a US release by Studio Ironcat, however, the company went out of business before the series was completed.

New Vampire Princess Miyu
 titled 新・吸血姫美夕 (Shin Vanpaia Miyu) with "Shin" meaning "new"

This series is encompassed in five volumes and covers the actual events that Miyu is given a glimpse of at the end of volume 10 of the original series. The Western Shinma, led by Pazusu, and supported by Carlua (his daughter), Lemunia (Lemures' younger brother), and a powerful young Shinma called Cait Sith. The Western Shinma succeed in kidnapping Larva, purging Miyu's blood from him, and sealing his memory of his time with her. This results in a showdown where Larva kills Miyu, although he is not entirely certain why he feels bothered by this. In actuality, Miyu is not quite dead as her spirit survives through her blood that was passed from Yui's mom into Yui in utero (see Vampire Princess Yui below). Yui is then drawn to Miyu's realm to help her be reborn. In the meantime, it's discovered that the "rescue mission" was all a ploy by Cait Sith to reach Japan and retrieve a short sword in which his mother's spirit is sealed. It is revealed not only was his mother sealed by the Watcher before Miyu, Cait Sith (both are members of a nearly extinct clan called the Quarl) was actually responsible for putting the idea of challenging the Eastern Shinma into Lemures' and Larva's heads originally. As Cait Sith succeeds in resurrecting the queen (though not without a catch and mortally wounding Pazusu), the race is on to get Yui safely to the spot of Miyu's rebirth. With the help of the second tier Eastern Shinma and Lemunia, she succeeds and Miyu is brought back to life. After unsealing Larva's memories and reestablishing the blood bond, Miyu and the remaining Western Shinma join forces to defeat the Quarl and destroy the Queen. Afterward, Pazusu asks Larva to kill him so he doesn't die of his wounds and Carlua makes one last attempt to wrest Larva away from Miyu by threatening to kill him. Miyu calls her bluff and Carlua retreats, thanks to the newly freed Lemures. He explains as they leave that during Miyu's time being dead, many stray Shinma (including himself) took advantage of her absence to escape the Darkness once more. The series ends with Miyu and Larva heading off to start rounding these escapees up again.

This series was also licensed by Studio Ironcat for an English-language release, but the company actually completed the series before going out of business.

Vampire Princess Yui
Yui is the daughter of human and a Shi (another type of demon, also described as anti-shinma in some English translations). She is also part vampire as Miyu's blood runs in her veins, as Miyu fed on her mother while pregnant with Yui. Miyu describes Yui as both her sister, her daughter, and herself. Yui has long dark hair, and looks to be about twelve or thirteen years old. Like Miyu, Yui has a tragic past and friends she had to abandon upon her awakening. Yui has the additional issue of being both hunted and supported by rival factions of Shi, who do not approve of her existence. Also like Miyu, Yui has a blood bonded protector, a younger shinma named Nagi. Yui's personality is much more shy and timid than Miyu's, and she is still largely naive about the world at large. Nagi is very hot headed, but is a faithful companion, allowing Yui to feed on him as she refuses to feed on humans. Yui's weapon of choice are cherry blossoms, which she can bend to her will in a variety of ways. She passes this power to Miyu upon giving up her own blood for Miyu's rebirth.

Another series licensed by Studio Ironcat for an English-language release. Despite publishing the series in full in monthly comic installments, the company only released one collected volume before going out of business.

Vampire Yui: Kanonshou
The sequel to Vampire Princess Yui. A mysterious girl arrives at the door of a church covered in blood, crying out the name "Nagi" before collapsing. The church's priest takes in the silent, amnesiac girl, and gently cares for her. Soon, the girl starts to have strange dreams about her past, dreams that name her as the Vampire Princess Yui.

Yui is happy living quietly in the mountain church, surrounded by sakura trees, but this peace cannot last for long. Word from the nearby villagers of vampire attacks in the area confirm that, whether she likes it or not, her past is going to catch up with her!

Another series licensed by Studio Ironcat for an English-language release. Of the eight collected volumes, only one was published before the company went out of business.

Anime

AnimEigo originally released the OVA series on two VHS tapes in 1992 with separate editions containing English audio and English subtitles, each containing a sheet of liner notes related to the series. The liner notes were eventually redone for the DVD release and included in Volume 1. The Volume 2 DVD contains a card with a humorously worded message stating that the complete liner notes are available in the first volume, and that if some form of insert were not included in the second, consumers would undoubtedly start complaining. In the UK, the series was licensed by Manga UK, who produced an alternate English dub for VHS in the UK (this dub was also shown on the British Sci-Fi Channel). However, AnimEigo's dub was used for the UK DVD release.

Tokyopop originally released the TV series to VHS and DVD in 2001–2002. The first DVD volume of their release is notable for only retaining the opening for episode 1 and end credits for episode 3. This practice, which was fairly common in the VHS era of anime releases, apparently received a significant amount of criticism as the remaining five DVDs were released with all episodes featuring the opening and ending credit sequences.

Tokyopop's license later expired, and the series was re-licensed by Maiden Japan in 2013, which re-released the series in one box set.

Reception
Critical reception of the Vampire Princess Miyu OVA series has been generally positive. Anime News Network praised the OVA series for its "dark, surreal tour of the occult", while it criticizes the dub, saying "the casting was off-center". Overall, the English dub was given a C− and the subtitled version was given an A−. Raphael See of THEM Anime Reviews gave the OVA series a rating of 4 out of 5 stars, praising the animation, art, action scenes, story, and soundtrack but criticized the backgrounds, saying that they were "a bit on the sketchy side."

Critical reception of the Miyu TV series has also been generally positive. Jeremy A. Beard of THEM Anime Reviews game the series a rating of 3 out of 5 stars, praising the characters, atmosphere, soundtrack, character and Shinma designs, and the story, but criticized the show for having too much unnecessary filler, stating that "I think that if Vampire Princess Miyu was only 13 episodes long, it would have been a better experience overall. The main plot episodes are the most enjoyable and it would not have seriously harmed the show to cut out a lot of the more extraneous shinma hunts." Another reviewer from THEM Anime Reviews, Carlos Ross, also gave the Miyu TV series a rating of 3 out of 5 stars, praising the story, soundtrack, and voice actors, but noted that the animation was a step down from the OVA series, and criticized the Sailor Moon-style "Monster-of-the-Day" formula of the series. Overall, Ross concludes that "this is no Goosebumps story, folks. This can be really creepy, and it's definitely not for the under-twelves." Cody J. Riebe of PopMatters gave the TV series a positive review, praising the story, soundtrack, atmosphere, and animation, with his only criticisms being the series' first episode and the poor localization by Tokyopop. Riebe also notes that the series never gained any traction in Western regions, stating that "the real tragedy of Vampire Princess Miyu is that one of the more interesting series of the ’90s is out of print and largely reduced to a horror anime footnote."

Erica Friedman from Okazu in her review of the spin-off manga Vampire Princess noted that this part of the series is close enough to the fact that it could be interpreted as yuri, and the relationship between the two main characters as a kind of sexual seduction, also pointing at obvious homoerotism of the image of vampirism in the work. At the same time, reviewing the anime adaptation of the original series, she described the end of the series as "Volume 6 of Vampire Princess Miyu answers a lot of questions. But it answers those questions in the bizarrest and least logical way, for which I give it a lot of credit", while noting absence of any romantic resolution or even confirmed affection in the work.

See also
Vampire film
List of vampire television series

References

Further reading

External links
 Official AnimEigo site
 

 
1988 anime OVAs
1997 anime television series debuts
Akita Shoten manga
Anime International Company
Miyu
Miyu
Horror anime and manga
Madman Entertainment anime
Maiden Japan
Seinen manga
Shōjo manga
Tokyopop titles
TV Tokyo original programming
Vampires in animated film
Vampires in animated television
Vampires in anime and manga
Television series about princesses